Marimenuco Airfield was an airstrip  west-southwest of Marimenuco, a hamlet in the Araucanía Region of Chile.

Google Earth Historical Imagery shows a north–south power line crossing midfield since at least (5/1/2008).

See also

Transport in Chile
List of airports in Chile

References 

Defunct airports
Airports in Chile
Airports in La Araucanía Region